Wuhan Metro Line 11 is a metro line in Wuhan. This line connects Wuchang with the eastern Optics Valley. Construction of the first section Optic Valley section started on October 28, 2014.

History

Stations

References

 
2018 establishments in China
Railway lines opened in 2018